David Pakman (born February 2, 1984) is an American progressive talk show host and political commentator. He is the host of the YouTube and Twitch talk radio program The David Pakman Show. He was born in Buenos Aires, Argentina, and is a naturalized citizen of the United States.

Early life 
David Pakman was born to an Ashkenazi Jewish family in Buenos Aires, Argentina in February 1984 and immigrated to the United States of America at the age of five. He grew up in Northampton, Massachusetts, and graduated from Northampton High School. Pakman attended the University of Massachusetts Amherst in Amherst, Massachusetts, where he majored in economics and communications. He earned an MBA degree from Bentley University in Waltham, Massachusetts.

Career 

Pakman hosts The David Pakman Show, a television, radio, and Internet political program. In 2005, Pakman began hosting a show on local radio as a "hobby", and by 2011 the show aired on 100 stations, and outlets including DirecTV and DISH Network through Free Speech TV, the PACIFICA Radio Network, on YouTube, LBRY, and via podcasts. The program first aired in August 2005 on WXOJ-LP ("Valley Free Radio"), located in Northampton, Massachusetts, as Midweek Politics with David Pakman. Pakman has appeared on Fox News, CNN, HLN's Nancy Grace program,  HLN's Dr Drew on Call, and two episodes of The Joe Rogan Experience and in Mother Jones, the Boston Herald, The New York Times, and Wired.

Personal life 
Pakman announced that he would be taking paternity leave in June 2022. His first child, a daughter, was born on June 10th.

References

External links 
 
 
 
 

1984 births
American agnostics
American male journalists
American people of Argentine descent
American people of Argentine-Jewish descent
American political commentators
American social democrats
American talk radio hosts
American YouTubers
Argentine YouTubers
Argentine agnostics
Argentine Jews
Argentine emigrants to the United States
Argentine people of Jewish descent
Bentley University alumni
Boston College faculty
Critics of religions
Critics of alternative medicine
Free speech activists
Hispanic and Latino American mass media people
Hispanic and Latino American journalists
Jewish agnostics
Jewish American journalists
Living people
Massachusetts Independents
People from Buenos Aires
People from Northampton, Massachusetts
Progressivism in the United States
Radio personalities from Massachusetts
University of Massachusetts Amherst College of Social and Behavioral Sciences alumni
Twitch (service) streamers
Naturalized citizens of the United States